USS Winnetka was a harbor tug in service with the United States Navy, built in 1944 at Port Arthur, Texas, by the Gulfport Boiler & Welding Works, Inc. She was placed in service on 28 June 1944. She departed Galveston, Texas on 18 July and proceeded via the Panama Canal to the Pacific. The tug served for some time at Pearl Harbor but, by the beginning of 1945, had moved west to the Marianas Islands for operations principally at Guam and Saipan. She was later reassigned to the naval base at Iwo Jima in the Volcano-Bonins chain and served there until January 1946 when she ran aground on Iwo Jima. Damaged beyond economic repair and not economically salvageable, Winnetka was abandoned where she lay. Her name was struck from the Navy list on 19 July 1946.

Ship Awards
American Campaign Medal
World War Two Victory Medal
Asiatic Pacific Campaign Medal

External links
 USS Winnetka YTB-376
 NavSource, YTB-376

1944 ships
Ships of the United States Navy
Ships built in Port Arthur, Texas